The Houston and Texas Central Railway (H&TC), was an 872-mile (1403-km) railway system chartered in Texas in 1848, with construction beginning in 1856.  The line eventually stretched from Houston northward to Dallas and Denison, Texas. with branches to Austin and Waco.

History

Ebenezer Allen of Galveston, Texas obtained the charter to establish a railroad company on March 11, 1848. A series of meetings about the establishment of the company occurred in Chappell Hill and Houston. In 1852, the Galveston and Red River Railway (G&RR) company became active. Other investors included Paul Bremond, Thomas William House, Sr., William J. Hutchins, Francis Moore, Benjamin A. Shepherd, James H. Stevens, William Marsh Rice, and William Van Alstyne.

The start of construction occurred on January 1, 1853, when Bremond and House broke ground in Houston. Track-laying of the  gauge railroad began in early 1856. On July 26, 1856, the track-laying reached the  point, at Cypress. The railroad company name changed from G&RR to H&TC on September 1, 1856. By April 22, 1861 the railroad construction had reached the  point at Millican. Because of the Civil War, the railroad construction was halted. In 1867, with the war over, construction resumed.

In 1867, the H&TC railroad company took control of the Washington County Railroad (1856–1868). The H&TC completed the line to Austin on December 25, 1871.

H&TC rails reached Corsicana in 1871, Dallas in 1872, and Red River City, Texas (now Denison) in 1873, where it connected with the Missouri, Kansas and Texas Railroad. This formed the first all-railroad route from Houston to St. Louis, Missouri, and the Eastern United States for freight and passengers.

The H&TC was sold to Charles Morgan in March 1877 but continued to operate independently until 1927, when it was leased to the Texas and New Orleans Railroad, a subsidiary of the Southern Pacific Railroad.  The HT&C was merged into the T&NO in 1934.  The T&NO was merged into the SP in 1961, and the SP into the Union Pacific in 1996.

U.S. Route 75 was built on top of the abandoned H&TC from Downtown Dallas to Elsworth Avenue still in Dallas. This highway was locally named as North Central Expressway in homage of the H&TCENTRAL Railroad. The Dallas Area Rapid Transit railroad purchased the track in 2012 and runs the commuter train on the former H&TC from Elsworth Avenue to Plano. From that point, the abandonment continues to McKinney, Texas.

See also

Confederate railroads in the American Civil War
List of Texas railroads

Impressions of 1891

References

External links
 Abandoned rails
 Houston Metropolitan Research Center, Houston Public Library 1902 Houston and Texas Central Map
 Texas State Library and Archives Commission Schedule of the Houston and Texas Central Railway, 1879

Defunct Texas railroads
Predecessors of the Southern Pacific Transportation Company
5 ft 6 in gauge railways in the United States
1852 establishments in Texas